The CEV Champions League was the highest level of European club volleyball in the 2017–18 season and the 58th edition. The Turkish club VakıfBank Istanbul won its fourth overall and second consecutive title. The Romanian club CSM Volei Alba Blaj won the silver medal and Italian Imoco Volley Conegliano claimed the bronze medal. The Turkish Gözde Kırdar Sonsırma from VakıfBank Istanbul, who will retire, was awarded Most Valuable Player.

Qualification

A total of 16 team participate of the main competition, with 12 teams being allocated direct vacancies on the basis of ranking list for European Cup Competitions and 4 teams qualified from the qualification rounds.
Drawing of lots was held in Moscow, Russia on 17 November 2017.

1.Team qualified via Champions League qualification.

Format
League round
A round-robin format (each team plays every other team in its pool twice, once home and once away) where the 16 participating teams are drawn into 4 pools of 4 teams each.

The standings is determined by the number of matches won.
In case of a tie in the number of matches won by two or more teams, their ranking is based on the following criteria:
result points (points awarded for results: 3 points for 3–0 or 3–1 wins, 2 points for 3–2 win, 1 point for 2–3 loss);
set quotient (the number of total sets won divided by the number of total sets lost);
points quotient (the number of total points scored divided by the number of total points lost);
results of head-to-head matches between the teams in question.

Playoffs
A knockout format where the 6 qualified teams are each draw into one of the 3 matches with each match consisting of two legs (home and away).
Result points are awarded for each leg (3 points for 3–0 or 3–1 wins, 2 points for 3–2 win, 1 point for 2–3 loss). The Golden Set winner is the team that first obtains 15 points, provided that the points difference between the two teams is at least 2 points (thus, the Golden Set is similar to a tiebreak set in a normal match).

Final Four
A single-elimination format where the three winners of the Playoffs are joined by the Final Four hosts and draw to play the semifinals (winners advance to the final and losers to the 3rd place match). In case two teams from the same country qualify for the semifinals, they will play each other.

Pools composition
Drawing of lots was held on 17 November 2017 in Moscow, Russia.

Squads

League round

All times are local.

Pool A

|}

|}

Pool B

|}

|}

Pool C

|}

|}

Pool D

|}

|}

Playoffs
Drawing of lots held in Luxembourg City, Luxembourg on 2 March 2018.

Playoff 6

|}

First leg

|}

Second leg

|}

Final four
Organizer:  CSM Volei Alba Blaj
Venue: Sala Polivalentă, Bucharest, Romania

Semifinals

|}

3rd place match

|}

Final

|}

Final standing

Awards  

Most Valuable Player
  Gözde Kırdar Sonsırma (VakıfBank Istanbul)
Best Setter
  Joanna Wołosz (Imoco Volley Conegliano)
Best Outside Spikers 
  Zhu Ting (VakıfBank Istanbul) 
  Kimberly Hill (Imoco Volley Conegliano)

Best Middle Blockers
  Milena Rašić (VakıfBank Istanbul)
  Nneka Onyejekwe (CSM Volei Alba Blaj) 
Best Opposite Spiker
  Ana Cleger (CSM Volei Alba Blaj) 
Best Libero  
  Hatice Gizem Örge (VakıfBank Istanbul)

Record

On 6 May 2018, in the final game of the 2018 Champions League, VakıfBank Istanbul attained the record of the best score in a volleyball European cup final since the Rally Point System was adopted, with only 45 points lost. Consequently, CSM Volei Alba Blaj holds the record for the worst score.

References

External links
Official website

CEV Women's Champions League
CEV Women's Champions League
CEV Women's Champions League